The fifth season of Younger, an American comedy-drama television series created by Darren Star, was ordered on April 20, 2017. It premiered on June 5, 2018, and revolves around the lead Liza Miller, who has to manage her career in the publishing company having faked her identity as a younger woman to get her job, whereas her romantic life is marked by ups and comings. The season was produced by Darren Star Productions and Jax Media, with Star serving as showrunner.

Sutton Foster stars as Miller, with Debi Mazar, Miriam Shor, Hilary Duff, Nico Tortorella, Molly Bernard and Peter Hermann also returning from the fourth season. They are joined by Charles Michael Davis, who was promoted to series regular. The fifth season is the first to feature a Christmas special episode. Younger was renewed for a sixth season on June 4, 2018.

Cast

Main 
 Sutton Foster as Liza Miller
 Debi Mazar as Maggie Amato
 Miriam Shor as Diana Trout
 Nico Tortorella as Josh
 Hilary Duff as Kelsey Peters
 Peter Hermann as Charles Brooks
 Molly Bernard as Lauren Heller
 Charles Michael Davis as Zane Anders

Recurring 
 Chris Tardio as Enzo De Luca 
 Jason Ralph as Jake Devereux 
 Jennifer Westfeldt as Pauline Turner-Brooks

Guest 

 Grant Shaud as Bob Katz 
 Richard Masur as Edward L.L. Moore 
 Alanna Masterson as Kiara Johnson 
 Christian Borle as Don Ridley 
 Tessa Albertson as Caitlin Miller 
 Jesse James Keitel as Tam 
 Gina Gershon as Chrissie Hart 
 Michael McKenzie as Luca 
 Lois Robbins as Penelope 
 Paul Fitzgerald as David Taylor 
 Maddie Corman as Julia Katz 
 Sarah Cohen as Rose Katz 
 Tonye Patano as Akilah Jeffreis 
 Stephanie Szostak as Dr. Sophia Bell 
 Sally Pressman as Malkie 
 Martha Plimpton as Cheryl Sussman 
 Laura Benanti as Quinn Tyler 
 Michael Urie as Redmond 
 Phoebe Dynevor as	Clare

Episodes

Production

Development 
Younger was renewed for a fifth season on April 20, 2017, ahead of the fourth season's premiere. The season started filming in February 2018. Foster has revealed that the season has a Christmas special installment and the premiere episode revolves around the Me Too movement.

Casting 
In February 2018, it was announced that Charles Michael Davis had been promoted to series regular, after appearing in a recurring capacity in the previous season. In March 2018, Sutton Foster's ex-husband Christian Borle joined the cast in the guest role of a journalist named Don Ridley. In May 2018, Laura Benanti was announced as a guest actress, playing a "self-made billionaire" who "pitches a book to Millennial on her every-woman-for-herself approach to business." While being interviewed to TV Insider, Foster revealed that Martha Plimpton is returning to season 5 as Cheryl Sussman, a recurring character in the series. Moreover, Molly Bernard revealed that Jesse James Keitel would portray a "gender-queer assistant" to her character.

Marketing 
The first teaser trailer of the season was released on May 9, 2018. On June 3, 2018, the season premiere was screened at the annual Split Screens television festival in New York, followed by a "questions-and-answers" interview with cast members Debi Mazar, Nico Tortorella and Charles Michael Davis, and executive producers Dottie Zicklin and Alison Brown. The second episode of the season was screened in June 2018 at the annual ATX Television Festival in Austin, Texas.

Reception

Ratings

Critical response 
Younger's fifth season received positive reviews from critics. The review aggregator Rotten Tomatoes gave the season a 100% approval rating, with an average rating of 7.87/10, based on 9 reviews. Hanh Nguyen of IndieWire deemed that the fifth season is a "more mature phase" in front of previous seasons, stating that the series "shows promise in being able to adapt and grow, no matter what its age." While analyzing the premiere episode, Lizzy Buczak of TV Fanatic affirmed that the fifth season is "shaping up to be quite a great season." Jen Chaney of the Vulture magazine praised the season's take on reality, stating the series "obviously has no qualms about stretching the bounds of believability to suit its narrative, but the season's ending is one of those times when the show actually opts to be realistic."

Miriam Shor and her character Diana Trout were among TVLine's "Scene Stealers" of 2018, praising the character's "eventful" course in the season and Shor's performance. Upon the season finale's airing, Nico Tortorella was mentioned in TVLine's "Performers of the Week" article, with the writers commenting, "Tortorella’s innate ability to pivot from optimistic to devastated, as effortlessly as one would flip a light switch, is truly a gift."

Accolades 
Due to her performance in the season, Shor was nominated for a Critics' Choice Television Award for Best Supporting Actress in a Comedy Series. The series was among the binge-watching-worthy shows of 2018 of the 44th ceremony of the People's Choice Awards.

References

External links 

 
 

2018 American television seasons